GünAz TV is an Azerbaijani-language television channel based in Chicago and broadcasting in Europe, West Asia, North Africa, and Central Asia. It is run by Ahmad Obali, who founded it in 2004. Ideologically, the television channel promotes a pan-Turkist viewpoint and supports ethnic Azerbaijani separatism in Iran.

History 
The channel has its origins in 2004, when Ahmad Obali founded it with the self-proclaimed purpose of protecting the rights of Iranian Azerbaijanis. It was given the name GünAz, a portmanteau made up from "Güney Azərbaycan", which translates to "South Azerbaijan", a term used by Azerbaijani nationalists to describe Iranian Azerbaijan. The overwhelming majority of its content has been anti-Iranian, with a 2014 study by an Iranian-Azerbaijani researcher finding that 86.64% of all programs broadcast on the channel have been aimed at portraying Iran negatively, without a single one portraying it positively.

In 2006 it was banned from broadcasting via Türksat in response to an Iranian complaint following the channel's calling on Iranian Azerbaijanis to engage in terrorism against the state during the 2006 protests in Iran, as well as a Turkish state investigation that concluded foreign intelligence agencies were behind its operation. From that point on, the channel has broadcast only from TelStar and Hot bird satellites. Reportedly, the loss of their ability to use Türksat heavily reduced the channel's viewership within Iran.

In 2019, GünAz TV played a role in the spreading the story of 's alleged rape by Iranian MP Salman Khodadadi by publishing an interview with her. The interview included several audio files that were claimed to be evidence of sexual assault. Khodadadi rejected the accusations made by her in the interview and was later tried and acquitted of charges by the Supreme Court.

Funding 
According to Obali, GünAz TV receives all of its funding from viewer donations, being entirely independent of any governmental support. However, it has never publicly disclosed its financial resources or sources of funding. It is suspected that the owner, Ahmad Obali, uses the chain of restaurants he owns in Chicago to launder money, using what is earned from it to fund his media operations. In 2008, Chicago authorities prosecuted and brought Obali to court for financial violations relating to his restaurant business. Allegedly, Obali also maintains ties to the Azerbaijani mafia in Russia, making use of them to procure various financial resources. Additionally, it is clear from some of its programs that the channel operates offices and studios in Baku, making it evident that it enjoys some level of support from the ruling authorities of Azerbaijan, despite official denials. The government-backed Congress of World Azerbaijanis have also publicly stated their support for the channel. Asides from the Azerbaijani government, Turkey accused the American Central Intelligence Agency (CIA) of renting the satellite channels used to host GünAz in 2006.

Controversy

Racism against Kurds and Persians 
Numerous articles on their website and statements during broadcasts have expressed racist views towards the ethnically Kurdish population of West Azerbaijan province. Their website regularly publishes articles calling Kurds backwards, primitive, criminal, and inclined towards terrorism. Similarly, hosts on the channel regularly make inciteful assertions about Persians. One by the name of Yasaman Qaraqoyunlu criticized Azerbaijanis simply for following the same religion as Persians, Shia Islam, stating:Which translates to:"I am not against the religion of Islam, rather I am against Shiism, which has united us with the Persians."

CIA connections 
According to a 2006 article by the Hürriyet newspaper, following a complaint about GünAz TV from the Iranian foreign ministry, the Turkish government launched an investigation into the channel. As a result of the technical analysis, It was discovered that the United States' Central Intelligence Agency had been renting channels from Türksat, including the ones used for GünAz TV and a Kurdish separatist channel, with the purpose of broadcasting anti-government propaganda activities into Iran. This resulted in the channel being banned from broadcasting via Turkey.

References 

Television stations in Azerbaijan
Television networks in Azerbaijan
Azerbaijani-language television stations
Television channels and stations established in 2004
Anti-Iranian sentiments
Pan-Turkism
Azerbaijan–Iran relations